Malli Raava is a 2017 Indian Telugu-language romantic drama film written and directed by debutant Gowtam Tinnanuri, and produced by Rahul Yadav Nakka. The film stars Sumanth and Aakanksha Singh, the latter making her debut in Telugu cinema. The music is composed by Shravan Bharadwaj. The film was released on 8 December 2017 and received positive reviews from critics.

Plot 
A love story between Karthik and Anjali whose paths cross during three different stages of their lives.

Cast 
 Sumanth as Karthik
 Aakanksha Singh as Anjali
 Abhinav Gomatam as Subbu / Dumbo
 Annapoorna as Subbu / Dumbo's grandmother
 Preethi Asrani as Young Anjali
 Sathwik Varma as Young Karthik
 Karthik Adusumalli as Murali
 Anithanath as Sushma, Anjali's mother
 Appaji Ambarisha Darbha as Mohan, Anjali's father
 Mirchi Kiran as Manager Sowmitri
 Lahari Shari as Samyuktha, Subbu / Dumbo's Wife
 Kadambari Kiran as Social Studies Teacher

Soundtrack 

The soundtrack was composed by Shravan Bharadwaj and became an instant hit, The lyrics were written by Krishnakanth. The audio was released on Madhura Audio.

Reception

Critical reception 
The Times of India gave 3 out of 5 stars stating "Watch this one if you’ve ever been in love, especially if you know the bittersweet pain of falling in love for the first time". IndiaGlitz gave 3 out of 5 stars stating "A coming-of-age love story that caters to the tastes of multiplex audiences in good measure. If you like mature dramas that have an inkling of the ways of the human mind and life, you will love it!  Look out for the neat performances and some stirring dialogues". Hemanth Kumar from Firstpost.com, who gave it 3.25/5, said, "for a film which doesn’t really have much to say or say anything differently, it’s a surprise that Malli Raava tugs your heartstrings in the end". 

123Telugu.com gave it 3.25/5 and wrote "Malli Raava is a subtle love story which has some beautiful moments throughout." Sangeetha Devi Dundoo of The Hindu was a bit more critical and wrote, "If only Malli Raava had been more interesting, it wouldn't have ended up as a reminder of Yeto Vellipoyindhi Manasu which addressed issues of growing up, decisions and romance across decades more effectively". Great Andhra gave 2.75 out of 5 stars stating " Though this love story is not for all. Youngsters and guys with too-romantic a mind can enjoy it, but for others, this is not gripping enough".

References

External links
 

2017 films
2010s Telugu-language films
Indian romantic comedy-drama films
Indian romantic musical films
Indian musical comedy-drama films
Indian coming-of-age films
Indian teen romance films
2017 romantic comedy-drama films
2010s musical comedy-drama films
2010s romantic musical films
2010s coming-of-age comedy-drama films
2010s teen romance films
Indian nonlinear narrative films
Films set in 1999
Films set in 2012
Films set in Hyderabad, India
Films directed by Gowtam Tinnanuri
Films set in Bangalore
Indian films set in New York City
Films shot in Hyderabad, India
Films shot in Bangalore
Films shot in New York City
2017 comedy films
2017 drama films
2017 directorial debut films